Melanie Skotnik (formerly Melfort; born 8 November 1982 in Hersbruck, West Germany) is a French-German high jumper. She holds both German and French citizenship through her parentage and represented Germany until 2004. She retired in June 2016.

Skotnik finished in seventh position and ninth position respectively in the finals of the 2007 World Championships and 2009 World Championships. She was eliminated in the qualification rounds of the 2005 and 2011 World Championships.

At her first Olympics - the 2008 Summer Olympics, Skotnik fell 4 cm short of reaching the final after clearing 1.89 metres to finish joint 16th place in the qualification round. At the 2012 Summer Olympics, she reached the final and finished in 9th place at 1.93m.

Skotnik's outdoor personal best jump is 1.96m, achieved on 11 August 2007 in Castres, which tied her with the French national outdoor record first set by Maryse Éwanjé-Épée on July 21, 1985. She has won several French Athletics Championships (outdoor and indoor) titles. However, she still competes in the German national championships as a member of LG Domspitzmilch Regensburg, but represents France internationally. Skotnik also holds the French national indoor record of 1.97m, achieved in Aubière on 18 February 2007 and in Dortmund in February 2003

Skotnik married a French sprinter, Jimmy Melfort, in July 2009. She reverted to her maiden name in 2013, announcing that she was in the process of divorcing Jimmy Melfort, who had been her coach since 2005.

Results in international competitions
Note: Only the position and height in the final are indicated, unless otherwise stated. (q) means the athlete did not qualify for the final, with the overall position and height in the qualification round indicated.

References

External links 
 
 
 
 

1982 births
Living people
People from Hersbruck
Sportspeople from Middle Franconia
German female high jumpers
French female high jumpers
German national athletics champions
Athletes (track and field) at the 2008 Summer Olympics
Olympic athletes of France
Athletes (track and field) at the 2012 Summer Olympics
Mediterranean Games silver medalists for France
Athletes (track and field) at the 2005 Mediterranean Games
Mediterranean Games medalists in athletics